Anatoly Petrovich Tarabrin (28 June 1935 – 11 February 2008) was a Russian rower who competed for the Soviet Union in the 1960 Summer Olympics.

He was born in Smolensk. He was a crew member of the 1960 Summer Olympics Soviet boat that won the bronze medal in the coxless four event. At the 1961 European Rowing Championships, he won silver with the coxless four in Prague. He died in Saint Petersburg, Russia, on 11 February 2008.

References

External links 
 
 
 

1935 births
2008 deaths
Russian male rowers
Soviet male rowers
Olympic rowers of the Soviet Union
Olympic bronze medalists for the Soviet Union
Olympic medalists in rowing
Medalists at the 1960 Summer Olympics
Rowers at the 1960 Summer Olympics
European Rowing Championships medalists